Volucella is a genus of large, broad-bodied, dramatic hover-flies. They have distinctive plumose aristae and the face is extended downward. They are strongly migratory and males are often territorial. Adults feed on nectar of flowers and are often seen sunning on leaves. The larvae of most species live in nests of bumblebees and social wasps, where they are detritivores and larval predators.

Selected species

Volucella anastasia Hull, 1946
Volucella arctica Johnson , 1916
Volucella bombylans (Linnaeus, 1758)
Volucella dracaena Curran
Volucella elegans Loew, 1862
Volucella eugenia Williston, 1887
Volucella evecta Walker , 1852 
Volucella facialis Williston , 1882 
Volucella inanis (Linnaeus, 1758)
Volucella inflata (Fabricius, 1794)
Volucella jeddona Bigot, 1875
Volucella linearis Walker, 1849
Volucella liquida Erichson in Wagner, 1841
Volucella lutzi Curran, 1930
Volucella matsumurai Han & Choi, 2001
Volucella nigricans Coquillett, 1898
Volucella nigropicta Portschinsky, 1884
Volucella pellucens (Linnaeus, 1758)
Volucella plumatoides Hervé-Bazin, 1923
Volucella suzukii Matsumura, 1916 
Volucella tau Bigot, 1883
Volucella unipunctata Curran, 1926
Volucella zonaria (Poda, 1761)

Gallery

References

 
Diptera of Asia
Diptera of Europe
Hoverfly genera
Eristalinae
Taxa named by Étienne Louis Geoffroy